Le Domaine Forget de Charlevoix is an international Music Festival as well as a music and dance Academy located in Saint-Irénée, Charlevoix, in Quebec, in Canada. This domain is a operated by a non-profit organization occupying a large set of land and buildings located in Saint-Irénée, near La Malbaie. Concerts take place in the Concert Hall. Since the concert hall opened in 1996, it has also hosted a variety program.

A meeting place for great musical traditions from all over the world, it welcomes more than 400 artists to its various activities each year. Its International Festival presents each summer more than seventy events including more than thirty concerts focused mainly on classical music, but also relating to jazz and dance, a dozen brunches-music and twenty activities free awareness. The International Academy, at the heart of Domaine Forget's activities, welcomes some 120 pedagogues and nearly 500 students each year to its professional development sessions. Affecting different families of instruments or disciplines, these sessions include: Brass, Composition, Piano, Wood, Chamber music, Vocals and vocal accompaniment, Guitar, Dance, Strings, Conducting, String ensemble and Choir, Variety programming is devoted to popular music, song, humor, theater, cinema and much more.

History
At the turn of the twentieth century, Domaine Forget was three separate estates owned by three eminent Canadians. Les Sablons was owned by Joseph Lavergne, a judge and colleague of Sir Wilfrid Laurier; Hauterive was the property of Adolphe-Basile Routhier, a judge and the lyricist of the French language version of O Canada. Gil'Mont, which forms the major part of the property, was the estate of Rodolphe Forget, a Member of Parliament and investor and entrepreneur in the Charlevoix region.

In 1945, Les Petites Franciscaines de Marie, a religious order, first purchased Gil'Mont as the school "Institut Familial" (Family Institute), and a year later bought the properties belonging to Judges Laverge and Routhier in order to protect the privacy of the educational institution. In 1977, the school was converted into what is now known as Le Domaine Forget, a non-profit corporation with a mission of promoting music and dance.

International Festival
The festival features dance, jazz, and, most prominently, classical music. Concerts run from June to September and feature well-known artists from all over the world.

The festival concerts take place almost exclusively in the Concert Hall, a 600-seat concert hall constructed in 1996 by Le Domaine Forget and known for its remarkable acoustics.

International Music and Dance Academy
The Academy plays host to a number of different masterclass sessions: Brass. Composition, Piano, Chamber Music, Voice & Vocal Accompaniment, Guitar, Dance, Strings, Conducting, String Ensemble and Choir. All occur at different times of the summer and fall and feature faculty from around Quebec, Canada, and the world. Domaine features the Paul-Lafleur Pavilion, a complex of double-occupancy rooms with 1 shared bathroom per 4 people and a recently renovated dormitory.  At the end of each session, a public concert is offered featuring student performances.

Notable International Festival performers
  Violinist Martin Beaver
 Clarinetist Jonathan Cohler 
 Oboist Hansjörg Schellenberger 
 Pianist Oliver Jones
 Pianist Gabriela Montero
 Jazz Guitarist and Vocalist John Pizzarelli
 Bassist François Rabbath
 Hornist James Sommerville
 Conductor Benjamin Zander
 Violinist, Violist, and Conductor Pinchas Zukerman
 National Youth Orchestra of Canada
 Orchestre Symphonique de Québec
 Youth Orchestra of the Americas

Notable International Music and Dance Academy teachers
  Violist Atar Arad
 Tubist Roger Bobo
 Trombonist James Box
 Clarinetist Jonathan Cohler 
 Clarinetist Larry Combs
 Bassoonist Daniele Damiano
 Oboist Elaine Douvas
 Jazz Trumpeter Tiger Okoshi
 Violist James Dunham
 Bassist Paul Ellison
 Cellist Matt Haimovitz
 Flutist Jeffrey Khaner
 Cellist Hans Jorgen Jensen
 Trumpeter Jens Lindemann
 Violinist Darren Lowe
 Clarinetist Jean-François Normand
 Flutist Emmanuel Pahud
 Violinist Régis Pasquier
 Bassist François Rabbath
 Oboist Hansjörg Schellenberger
 Hornist James Sommerville
 Trombonist Peter Sullivan
 Hornist Barry Tuckwell
 Hornist Radovan Vlatkovic
 Trumpeter James Watson
 Hornist Gail Williams
 Hornist Froydis Ree Wekre 
 Guitarist Fabio Zanon

References

External links
Official Website

See also
Saint-Irénée, a municipality

Classical music festivals in Canada
Festivals in Quebec
Music festivals in Quebec
Recurring events established in 1982